While anti-Zionism usually utilizes ethnic and political arguments against the existence or policies of the state of Israel, anti-Zionism has also been expressed within religious contexts which have, at times, colluded and collided with the ethnopolitical arguments over Israel's legitimacy. Outside of the liberal and socialist fields of anti-Zionist currents, the religious (and often ethnoreligious) arguments tend to predominate as the driving ideological power within the incumbent movements and organizations, and usually target the Israeli state's relationship with Judaism.

Within Judaism

In the early history of Zionism many traditional religious Jews opposed ideas of nationalism (Jewish or otherwise) which they regarded as a secular ideology, and because of an inherent suspicion of change. Key traditionalist opponents of Zionism included Isaac Breuer, Hillel Zeitlin, Aaron Shmuel Tamares, Hayyim, Elazar Shapiro (Muncatz), and Joel Teitelbaum, all waged ideological religious, as well as political, battles with Zionism each in their own way.

Today, the main Jewish theological opposition to Zionism stems from the Satmar Hasidim, which has more than 150,000 adherents worldwide. Even more strongly opposed to Zionism is the small Haredi Jewish organization known as Neturei Karta, which has less than 5,000 members, almost all of whom live in Israel.  According to The Guardian, "[e]ven among Charedi, or ultra-Orthodox circles, the Neturei Karta are regarded as a wild fringe".

In Islam
Muslim anti-Zionism generally opposes the state of Israel as an intrusion into what many Muslims consider to be Dar al-Islam, a domain rightfully and permanently ruled only by Muslims. Once Islamic rule is established in a country, non-Muslims are given dhimmi status as protected from violence.

Palestinians and other Muslim groups, as well as the government of Iran (since the 1979 Islamic Revolution), insist that the State of Israel is illegitimate and refuse to refer to it as "Israel", instead using the locution "the Zionist entity" (see Iran–Israel relations). In an interview with Time Magazine in December 2006, Mahmoud Ahmadinejad said "Everyone knows that the Zionist regime is a tool in the hands of the United States and British governments".

References

Anti-Zionism